The Bankruptcy Act of 1898 ("Nelson Act", July 1, 1898, ch. 541) was the first United States Act of Congress involving bankruptcy to give companies an option of being protected from creditors. Previous attempts at federal bankruptcy laws had lasted, at most, a few years.

Its popular name is a homage to the role of Senator Knute Nelson in its composition.

It was significantly amended by the Bankruptcy Act of 1938 and was superseded by the Bankruptcy Act of 1978.

See also
 Bankruptcy Act
 History of bankruptcy law in the United States

References

External links

Bankruptcy Attorney

United States bankruptcy legislation
1898 in American law
Repealed United States legislation
History of bankruptcy law